Nick's Trip is a 1993 crime novel from author George Pelecanos. It is set in Washington D.C. and focuses on bartender Nick Stefanos as he investigates the disappearance of an old friend's wife and the murder of another friend. It is the second of several Pelecanos novels to feature the character and the second book of a trilogy with Stefanos as the main character. The preceding book in this series is A Firing Offense and the series concludes with Down by the River Where the Dead Men Go.

Plot introduction
Nick Stefanos is a bartender at a neighborhood place called "The Spot". His high-school friend Billy Goodrich asks him to search for his missing wife.

Explanation of the novel's title
The title refers to Nick Stefanos' journeys in the novel both in his past (with Goodrich) and in the present on his investigation.

Characters
Nick Stefanos is now working as a bartender after being fired from his position with electrical goods chain "Nutty Nathan's". He remains friends with his old sales colleague Johnny McGinnes. Billy Goodrich is an old high school friend of Stefanos and the two took an extended road trip together after high school but have since lost touch.

Major themes 
The novel is concerned with substance abuse by the main characters.

Literary significance and reception 
The series as a whole has been described as tightly plotted with "intricacies to rival Hammett or Chandler". The novel is told from a first person perspective like many private investigator stories.

Footnotes 

1992 American novels
Novels by George Pelecanos
Novels set in Washington, D.C.
St. Martin's Press books